Ernesto Chaparro Esquivel (4 January 1901 – 10 July 1957) was a Chilean football defender. He was part of Chile's team at the 1928 Summer Olympics.

References

External links

1901 births
1957 deaths
Chilean footballers
Chile international footballers
Colo-Colo footballers
1930 FIFA World Cup players
Association football defenders
Olympic footballers of Chile
Footballers at the 1928 Summer Olympics